Mosgortrans is a state-owned company operating bus and electrical bus networks in Moscow and the Moscow Oblast.

See also

Mostransavto
Trams in Moscow

References

External links

Official site of the company

Bus companies of Russia
Transport in Moscow
Service companies of the Soviet Union
Transport in the Soviet Union
Intermodal transport authorities
Companies based in Moscow
Unitary Enterprises of Russia